Qadi Kola (also Romanized as Qādī Kolā and Qādī Kalā) is a village in Miandorud-e Kuchak Rural District, in the Central District of Sari County, Mazandaran Province, Iran. At the 2006 census, its population was 972, in 256 families.

References 

Populated places in Sari County